The 2017–18 season is Argentinos Juniors' 1st season back in the top-flight of Argentine football, following promotion from Primera B Nacional in 2016–17. The season covers the period from 1 August 2017 to 30 June 2018.

Current squad
.

Out on loan

Transfers

In

Out

Loan in

Loan out

Friendlies

Pre-season

Primera División

League table

Results by matchday

Copa Argentina

Notes

References

Argentinos Juniors seasons
Argentinos Juniors